Aaron Steven Lanfare (September 9, 1824 - August 19, 1875) was a first lieutenant in the Union Army and a Medal of Honor recipient for his actions in the American Civil War.

A pre-war merchant sailor, Lanfare enlisted in the 1st Connecticut Cavalry from Branford, Connecticut in November 1861, and was mustered out in August 1865. After his military service he returned to serve in the merchant marine, until his ship was lost in the West Indies.

Medal of Honor citation
Rank and organization: First Lieutenant, Company B, 1st Connecticut Cavalry. Place and date: At Sailors Creek, Va., April 6, 1865. Entered service at: Branford, Conn. Birth: Branford, Conn. Date of issue: May 3, 1865.

Citation:

Capture of flag of 11th Florida Infantry (C.S.A.).

See also
 List of American Civil War Medal of Honor recipients: G–L

References

External links
 

1824 births
1875 deaths
United States Army Medal of Honor recipients
Union Army officers
People from Branford, Connecticut
People of Connecticut in the American Civil War
American Civil War recipients of the Medal of Honor
Military personnel from Connecticut